Toulgoetodes is a genus of moths of the family Crambidae.

Species
Toulgoetodes boudinoti Leraut, 1988
Toulgoetodes pallida Leraut, 1988
Toulgoetodes tersella (Zeller, 1872)
Toulgoetodes toulgoeti Leraut, 1988

References

Natural History Museum Lepidoptera genus database

Scopariinae
Crambidae genera